Wolgastsee is a lake in Usedom, Mecklenburg-Vorpommern, Germany. At an elevation of -0.6 m, its surface area is 0.47 km².

External links 
 

Lakes of Mecklenburg-Western Pomerania